Günther Rüdel (15 November 1883 – 22 April 1950) was a German general in the Luftwaffe during World War II.

Biography 
Günther Rüdel was born in Metz, in Alsace-Lorraine, on 15 November 1883. Rüdel served as a captain during World War I, working for the Ministry of War. Günther Rüdel made a brilliant military career in the Reichswehr, then in the Luftwaffe. He attained the grade of Generalleutnant in April 1936, and General der Flakartillerie in October 1937. Rüdel was assigned "Inspekteur der Flakartillerie" from 1938 to 1942. During the Second World War, Günther Rüdel attained the grade of Generaloberst in November 1942.

Rüdel stood up to Adolf Hitler in the Beer Hall Putsch, the failed 1923 coup d'état against the Weimar Republic government, stopping him from shooting an official with his pistol. His grandson, John Crane, a civilian US military executive in charge of its whistleblower protection unit, himself became a whistleblower in 2013.

Dates of ranks 
 Fähnrich : 5 July 1902
 Leutnant : March 1904
 Oberleutnant : March 1912
 Hauptmann : 9 August 1915
 Major : 1 December 1923
 Oberstleutnant : 1 February 1929
 Oberst : 1 October 1934
 Generalleutnant : 1 April 1936 ;
 General der Flakartillerie : 1 October 1937
 Generaloberst : 1 November 1942

Medals and decorations 
 Iron Cross of 1914, 1st and 2nd class
 Knight's Cross of the Royal House Order of Hohenzollern with Swords
 Military Merit Order (Bavaria), 4th class with Swords
 Hanseatic Cross of Hamburg
 Wilhelm Ernst War Cross
 Order of the Iron Crown, 3rd class with War Decoration (Austria)
 Military Merit Cross, 3rd class with War Decoration (Austria-Hungary)
 Honour Cross of the World War 1914/1918
 Wehrmacht Long Service Award, 4th with 1st class
 War Merit Cross (1939), 1st and 2nd class with Swords
  Knights Cross of the War Merit Cross with swords
 Anti-Aircraft Flak Battle Badge

References 

 Rüdel, Günther on lexikon-der-wehrmacht.de

1883 births
1950 deaths
Military personnel from Metz
People from Alsace-Lorraine
German Army personnel of World War I
Luftwaffe World War II generals
Recipients of the Knights Cross of the War Merit Cross
Burials at Munich Waldfriedhof
Colonel generals of the Luftwaffe
Major generals of the Reichswehr